Nimrat Khaira is a Indian singer, and actress known for her work in Punjabi- language music and films.

Early life
Born in Gurdaspur, Khaira started singing in third grade. She is the only child of her parents. She completed her schooling from D.A.V.

Career
She is the winner of Voice of Punjab season 3. She gained fame after the release of her single "Ishq Kacheri". She performed at Saras Mela, held in Bathinda. She hosted the third edition of Radio Mirchi Music Awards.

She started her singing career from a duet song "Rab Karke" with Nishawn Bhullar, which was released on 24 September 2015 by record label Punj-aab Records. The song received good response from audience, but she got much fame through her next two songs "Ishq Kacheri" and "SP De Rank Wargi" both released in 2016. She continued her success with songs like "Salute Wajde" in 2016. In 2017, she launched many singles many of them overcame as massive hits like "Rohab Rakhdi", "Dubai Wale Sheikh", "Suit" and "Designer". She also won Best female vocalist award for her duo "Dubai Wale Sheikh" from Manje Bistre at Brit Asia Awards and nominated at Filmare Punjabi Award. The song also peaked on UK Asian chart. Her single "Suit" entered top 20 in the chart.

Also, her song "Designer" produced by Deep Jandu came in controversy after a foreign composer "Zwirek" claimed the music and the song was removed from YouTube but later, the song was readded to YouTube after music was proved legally original.

Discography

Albums

Singles

Film career
She started her film career in 2017 with Lahoriye, wherein she played the role of Kikkar (Amrinder Gill)'s sister Harleen Kaur. Her performance in film was appreciated by audience. She was also nominated for Best Debut Performance and Best Supporting Actress in different Award Ceremonies.

Her second film Afsar released on 5 October 2018. Film marks as Debut as lead actress for Nimrat Khaira. In film, Nimrat Khaira had shared screen with Tarsem Jassar. She had played the role of Harman who is Teacher in Government school. Her film Jodi, which is written and directed by Amberdeep Singh, is set to be released in 2020. In the film, she is co-starring Diljit Dosanjh. It is her second collaboration with Singh and Rhythm Boyz Entertainment after Lahoriye (2017).

She is co-starring Ammy Virk and Sargun Mehta in another ambitious project of Amberdeep Singh, Saunkan Saunkne , which is set to be released in 2021.

Filmography

Awards and nominations

References

External links
 
 
 

1992 births
Living people
Punjabi people
Punjabi-language singers